The Committee of European Banking Supervisors (CEBS) was an independent advisory group on banking supervision in the European Union (EU). Established by the European Commission in 2004 by Decision 2004/5/EC, and its charter revised on 23 January 2009, it was composed of senior representatives of bank supervisory authorities and central banks of the European Union. On 1 January 2011, this committee was succeeded by the European Banking Authority (EBA), which took over all existing and ongoing tasks and responsibilities of the Committee of European Banking Supervisors (CEBS). The European Banking Authority was established by Regulation (EC) No. 1093/2010 of the European Parliament and of the Council of 24 November 2010.

Its role was to:

 Advise the European Commission, on the latter's request, or within a time period the Commission may have set depending on the urgency of the matter, or acting on its own behalf, in particular as regards the preparation of draft measures in the scope of lending activities.
Contribute to the consistent implementation of EU directives and the convergence of financial supervisory practices in all member states of the entire European Community.
Improve supervisory cooperation, including exchange of information.

European Economic Area countries which are not EU members participated as permanent observers.

The other level-3 committees of the European Union in the Lamfalussy process are the Committee of European Securities Regulators and the Committee of European Insurance and Occupational Pensions Supervisors.

History

So the European Commission's decision (2009/78/EC) of 23 January 2009, "for reasons of legal security and clarity", repealed, in its 16th article Decision 2004/5/EC, which changed the legal framework of the committee.

On 1 January 2011, the committee was superseded by the European Banking Authority.

Roles (tasks)
In particular, according to article 2 of the Decision 2009/78/EC, 

According to article 3 of the same Decision, 

According to article 4 of same Decision,

According to article 5:

Article 6:

Structure (organisation and operation)
According to articles 7–15 of the Decision 2009/78/EC:

Article 7:

Article 8:

Article 9:

Article 10:

Article 11

Article 12

Article 13

Article 14

Article 15

Location
The office of the Secretariat of the CEBS was located in the City of London, UK.

See also

 European Banking Authority
 Committee of European Securities Regulators
 Committee of European Insurance and Occupational Pensions Supervisors
 Financial regulation
 European Commission
 European Commissioner for Internal Market and Services
 Lamfalussy process
 2010 European Union banking stress test exercise
 List of acronyms: European sovereign-debt crisis

References

External links
 The former official website of the Committee of European Banking Supervisors (http://www.c-ebs.org) now redirects to the official website of the European Banking Authority 
 2010 EU-wide banking stress-test results
 COREP and FINREP XBRL taxonomies of the Committee of European Banking Supervisors

Defunct financial regulatory authorities
Bank regulation
Regulation in the European Union
Banking in the European Union
2004 establishments in Europe
2011 disestablishments in Europe